William Dwight Jr. (July 14, 1831 – April 21, 1888), was a general in the Union Army during the American Civil War. Raised in Massachusetts, he came from a notable family of military leaders.

Early life
William Dwight was born July 14, 1831 in Springfield, Massachusetts. His father was William Dwight of the New England Dwight family who was born April 5, 1805. His mother was Elizabeth Amelia White, daughter of Judge Daniel Appleton White (1776–1861) and Mary Wilder (1780–1811).

Dwight was the second born son in a family of seven sons, three of whom, besides himself, served in the American Civil War. He was considered to be an out-spoken, boisterous, high-spirited boy, somewhat rude in his manner, sometimes troublesome, yet was said to possess a charm that made him well liked. The young Dwight also had a great love for the out door life and sport.

Starting in 1846 he attended a military preparatory school, and was admitted to the United States Military Academy at West Point, New York in 1849. However, he resigned January 31, 1853 and moved to Boston to work in manufacturing. On January 1, 1856 he married Anna Robeson.

Civil War

Dwight was moving to Philadelphia for his business when the American Civil War broke out. He took a commission of captain on May 14, 1861. He was promoted to lieutenant colonel on June 29, 1861 under Daniel Sickles, and full colonel on July 1, 1861.
As commanding officer of 70th New York Volunteer Infantry Regiment, Dwight led his regiment during the Battle of Williamsburg, where he was seriously wounded on May 5, 1862, along with losing half of his command. Left for dead on the battlefield, Dwight was found by Confederate forces and held as a prisoner of war until his eventual release in a prisoner exchange November 15, 1862.

In recognition of his gallantry on the field, Dwight was promoted to brigadier general of volunteers to rank from November 29, 1862, by Presidential nomination on March 4, 1863, and U.S. Senate confirmation on March 9, 1863.
He was transferred to the Western Theater where, later in 1863, he led his brigade in the attack of Port Hudson, Louisiana.

He served as chief-of-staff to Maj. Gen. Nathaniel P. Banks during the Red River Campaign in early 1864, with service at the Battle of Mansfield and Battle of Pleasant Hill in De Soto Parish, Louisiana, Dwight was reassigned to the Eastern Theater and was attached to the 1st Division of the 19th Army Corps. Serving under General Philip H. Sheridan, Dwight later participated in the Valley Campaigns of 1864 and saw action at the battles of Winchester and Fisher's Hill before the end of the war.

Younger brother Wilder Dwight was born April 23, 1833, became lieutenant colonel the 2nd Regiment Massachusetts Volunteer Infantry, and died September 19, 1862 from wounds at the Battle of Antietam.
Younger brother Howard Dwight was born October 29, 1837, became captain, and died May 4, 1863 during the Battle of Port Hudson.
Another younger brother Charles Dwight was born May 5, 1842 attended Harvard University but left to join the army. Charles was lieutenant  in the 70th regiment, taken prisoner in Libby Prison, but lived until March 9, 1884. Distant cousin Colonel Augustus Wade Dwight (1827–1865) died during the Battle of Fort Stedman.

Following the war, Dwight went into the railroad business in Cincinnati, Ohio with another brother Chapman Dwight who was born April 30, 1844. He had one son, William Arthur Dwight, born June 3, 1867.
William Dwight died on April 21, 1888 in Boston and was buried in Forest Hills Cemetery in Jamaica Plain, Massachusetts.

See also

List of American Civil War generals (Union)
List of Massachusetts generals in the American Civil War
Massachusetts in the American Civil War

Sources

References

Further reading
Linedecker, Clifford L., ed. Civil War, A-Z: The Complete Handbook of America's Bloodiest Conflict. New York: Ballantine Books, 2002.

External links

  Battlefield sketch.

1831 births
1888 deaths
19th-century American businesspeople
People of New York (state) in the American Civil War
Businesspeople from Springfield, Massachusetts
Union Army generals
United States Army officers
American Civil War prisoners of war
Military personnel from Cincinnati
Burials at Forest Hills Cemetery (Boston)
People from Springfield, Massachusetts
Military personnel from Massachusetts